Jefferson Township is one of thirteen townships in Putnam County, Indiana. As of the 2010 census, its population was 1,252 and it contained 525 housing units.

History
The Melville F. McHaffie Farm was listed on the National Register of Historic Places in 1983. The former Mill Creek Township consolidated with Jefferson Township in the mid-1930s.

Geography

Unincorporated towns
 Belle Union at 
 Broad Park at 
(This list is based on USGS data and may include former settlements.)

References

External links
 Indiana Township Association
 United Township Association of Indiana

Townships in Putnam County, Indiana
Townships in Indiana